The 2013 Dubai Tennis Championships (also known as the 2013 Dubai Duty Free Tennis Championships for sponsorship reasons) was a 500 event on the 2013 ATP World Tour and a Premier event on the 2013 WTA Tour. Both of the events took place at the Aviation Club Tennis Centre in Dubai, United Arab Emirates. The women's tournament took place February 18 to 23, while the men's tournament took place from February 25 to March 2.

Points and prize money

Point distribution

Prize money

* per team

ATP singles main-draw entrants

Seeds 

 Rankings are as of February 18, 2013.

Other entrants 
The following players received wildcards into the singles main draw:
  Malek Jaziri
  Rajeev Ram
  Dmitry Tursunov

The following players received entry from the qualifying draw:
  Daniel Brands
  Igor Kunitsyn
  Florent Serra
  Matteo Viola

Withdrawals 
Before the tournament
 Philipp Kohlschreiber
 Radek Štěpánek

Retirements
 Bernard Tomic (illness)

ATP doubles main-draw entrants

Seeds 

 Rankings are as of February 18, 2013.

Other entrants 
The following pairs received wildcards into the doubles main draw:
  Omar Awadhy /  Hamad Abbas Janahi
  Novak Djokovic /  Marko Djokovic

WTA singles main-draw entrants

Seeds 

 Rankings are as of February 11, 2013.

Other entrants 
The following players received wildcards into the singles main draw:
  Marion Bartoli
  Yulia Putintseva
  Laura Robson

The following players received entry from the qualifying draw:
  Daniela Hantuchová
  Svetlana Kuznetsova
  Urszula Radwańska
  Zheng Jie

The following player received entry as lucky loser:
  Carla Suárez Navarro

Withdrawals
Before the tournament
  Victoria Azarenka (right foot injury)
  Maria Kirilenko (shoulder injury)
  Li Na (left ankle injury)
  Serena Williams (lower back injury)

WTA doubles main-draw entrants

Seeds 

 Rankings are as of February 11, 2013.

Other entrants 
The following pairs received wildcards into the doubles main draw:
  Fatma Al-Nabhani /  Alicja Rosolska
  Julia Görges /  Angelique Kerber
  Lisa Raymond /  Samantha Stosur
The following pair received entry as alternates:
  Vera Dushevina /  Klára Zakopalová

Withdrawals
Before the tournament
  Elena Vesnina (viral illness)

Retirements
  Květa Peschke (left thigh strain)

Champions

Men's singles

 Novak Djokovic defeated  Tomáš Berdych 7–5, 6–3

Women's singles

 Petra Kvitová defeated  Sara Errani, 6–2, 1–6, 6–1

Men's doubles

  Mahesh Bhupathi /  Michaël Llodra defeated  Robert Lindstedt /  Nenad Zimonjić, 7–6(8–6), 7–6(8–6)

Women's doubles

 Bethanie Mattek-Sands /  Sania Mirza defeated  Nadia Petrova /  Katarina Srebotnik, 6–4, 2–6, [10–7]

References

External links
 Official website

 
2013
Dubai Tennis Championships
Dubai Tennis Championships
February 2013 sports events in Asia
March 2013 sports events in Asia